Molné is a surname. Notable people with the surname include:

Luis Molné (born 1926), Andorran alpine skier
Marc Forné Molné (born 1946), Andorran politician